Stickle Tarn is a small tarn near Harrison Stickle in Lake District, England. The tarn was enlarged by the building of a stone dam in 1838 and is used to supply water for the inhabitants of Langdale. The tarn is situated in a corrie, flanked on the west side by Harrison Stickle, and on the north by the massive imposing bulk of Pavey Ark's south face. The tarn is frequently visited by fellwalkers ascending to Pavey Ark's summit, or en route to High Raise from Great Langdale.

In February 2015 it was put up for sale by the Lake District National Park Authority, which was seeking to reduce its landholdings in the national park.

References

Lakes of the Lake District
South Lakeland District